Effelder may refer to the following places in Germany:

Effelder, Eichsfeld, a municipality in the Eichsfeld district, Thuringia
Effelder-Rauenstein, a municipality in the Sonneberg district, Thuringia
Effelder (river), a river in Thuringia and Bavaria, tributary of the Itz